The 2009–10 Egypt Cup is the seventy-ninth season of the Egypt Cup since its establishment in 1921. A total of 48 teams are contesting for the Cup.

Round of 32 
The sixteen 2009–10 Premier League teams entered the competition in this round, where they were joined by 16 winners from the preliminary round.

Round of 16

Quarterfinals

Semifinals

Final

Scorers 

5 goals
 Mohamed Fadl (Al-Ahly)

4 goals
 Gedo (Ittihad)

3 goals
 Abdel Malek(Haras El Hodood)

2 goals
 Mohamed Aboutreika (Al-Ahly)
 Mohab Said (Ismaily)
 Ahmed Ali (Ismaily)
 Abdallah El-Shahat (Ismaily)
 Ahmed Samir Farag (Ismaily)
 Ahmed Abdel-Ghani (Haras El Hodood)
 Sameh Adrous (El-Entag El-Harby)
 Ahmed Abdel-Zaher (El-Entag El-Harby)
 Mickaël Dogbé (El Geish)
 Mahmoud Samir (Ittihad)
 Mohammed Samara (Al-Mokawloon Al-Arab)
 Gamal Hamza (El Gouna)
 Ahmed Sherwyda (El-Masry)

1 goal
 Ahmed Shoukry (Al-Ahly)
 Sherif Abdel-Fadil (Al-Ahly)
 Mohamed Barakat (Al-Ahly)
 Hussein Yasser (Zamalek)
 Ahmed Gaafar (Zamalek)
 Mohamed Selliti (Ismaily)
 Cofie Bekoe (Petrojet)

1 goal cont.

 Islam El-Shater (Haras El Hodood)
 Mohamed Hamed (Haras El Hodood)
 Mekky (Haras El Hodood)
 Ahmed Salem Safi (Haras El Hodood)
 Hassan Mousa (El-Entag El-Harby)
 Hazem Fathi (El-Entag El-Harby)
 Ahmed Al-Muhammadi (ENPPI)
 Islam Awad (ENPPI)
 Zeka Goore (ENPPI)
 Ahmed Raouf (ENPPI)
 Vincent Die Foneye (ENPPI)
 Abdelhamid Hassan (Ittihad)
 Mahmoud Shaker Abdel Fatah (Ittihad)
 Basem Ali (Al-Mokawloon Al-Arab)
 Ihab El-Masry (Al-Mokawloon Al-Arab)
 Reda El-Weshi (Al-Mokawloon Al-Arab)
 Hamada El Sayed (Al-Mokawloon Al-Arab)
 Ramy Adel (Gouna)
 Ahmad Shedid Qinawi (El-Masry)
 Mohamed Khalifa (El-Masry)
 Karim Adel Abdel Fatah (Ghazl El-Mehalla)
 Ahmed Hassan Drogba (Ghazl El-Mehalla)
 Mahmoud Khafaga (Tanta)
 Amr Al-Fayoumi (Al-Rebat We Al-Anwar)
 Ibrahim Khalil (Al-Rebat We Al-Anwar)

 Own goals
 Alaa El-Ghoul (Al-Rebat We Al-Anwar for Petrojet)

References & External Links 
 Egypt Cup on FilGoal.com.
 Fixtures of Egypt Cup on GoalZZZ.com, but times are inaccurate.

0
Egypt Cup
Cup